The women's half marathon event at the 2011 Summer Universiade was held on 21 August.

Medalists

Individual

Team

Results

References
Results

Half
2011 in women's athletics
2011